The North American Men's Marathon Relay Championships was a men's international team long-distance running competition between North American nations. It was held on two occasions, in 2003 and 2004, both of which were incorporated into the annual Akron Marathon.

The relay format differed from six-man ekiden teams common in Japan, and instead featured teams of five runners covering 10 km legs for the first and third leg, 5 km legs for the second and fourth leg, then a final leg of 12.195 km to complete the classic 42.195 km marathon distance. The prize for first place was US$25,000.

The three competing nations were Canada, Mexico and the United States. Mexico won both competitions, with the United States placing second and Canada third in both 2003 and 2004. Salvador Miranda, Alejandro Suárez and Armando Torres were members of the winning Mexican team in both years and set the championship record of 2:05:30 hours at the first edition.

It was the first ever continental marathon relay championship and came five years after the folding of the IAAF World Road Relay Championships in 1998. The North American 5K Championships, also including a team road running format, was formed a year earlier in 2002.

Editions

Results

References

North American international sports competitions
Marathons in the United States
NACAC competitions
Sports in Akron, Ohio
Sports competitions in Ohio
2003 establishments in Ohio
2004 disestablishments in Ohio
Recurring sporting events established in 2003
Recurring sporting events disestablished in 2004
Athletics team events
Defunct athletics competitions